The XPW World Tag Team Championship was a world tag team championship in the Xtreme Pro Wrestling promotion.

The championship was introduced at Baptized in Blood III in 2002 and its inaugural champions were decided in a Fatal 4-Way Elimination tag team match that featured Mexico's Most Wanted (Halloween and Damián 666), The New Panthers (K. Malik Shabazz and Raphael Muhammed), the team of Pogo The Clown and Juantastico, and the team of American Wild Child and Shady. Only three teams would end up holding the XPW World Tag Team Championship, with two teams holding the titles on two occasions. Luke Hawx and Scorpio Sky were the final champions.

Title history

List of combined reigns

By Team

By wrestler

References

Tag team wrestling championships
Xtreme Pro Wrestling championships